The Alma is a small river in Crimea that flows from the Crimean Mountains in a broadly west-north-west direction to the Black Sea. Alma is the Crimean Tatar word for an "apple".

Geography 
The Alma, formed by the confluence of the Sary-su, the Savlykh-su and the Babuganka (Babuğan Yayla) rivers, flows mostly through the mountains. The Alminskoye and Partizanskoye storage reservoirs are located along its course.

History
During the Crimean War of 1853–1856, in the Battle of the Alma near the lower reaches of the Alma river, the allied British, French, and Ottoman armies defeated the Russians under Prince Aleksandr Sergeevich Menshikov on 20 September 1854.

References

External links

Bakhchysarai
Crimean War
Rivers of Crimea